Aditya Prakash Tare (born 7 November 1987) is an Indian cricketer. He is a wicketkeeper batsman who played for Mumbai Indians in the Indian Premier League and for Uttarakhand in domestic cricket.

Tare made his first-class debut in 2009, and IPL T20 debut on 19 Apr 2010 against Kolkata Knight Riders.

Ranji 
With 41 dismissals in the last season of Ranji trophy he has made a record for most dismissals by a wicketkeeper. He was the second highest run getter for the team with 842 Runs, which includes double century and three half centuries. He has also been awarded as the Best Mumbai Ranji Cricketer for 2012–13.

Mumbai Indians 
He has played for 5 matches, contributing a total of 123 runs including a half century against Rajasthan Royals. He has also been awarded ‘Man of the Match’ for his outstanding innings against Rajasthan Royals.

In February 2016, he was bought by the Sunrisers Hyderabad team for the 2016 Indian Premier League for 25 lakhs. In January 2018, he was bought by the Mumbai Indians in the 2018 IPL auction.

References

External links

Mumbaiindians Official Website
IPLT20.COM

1987 births
Marathi people
Living people
Indian cricketers
Mumbai cricketers
Mumbai Indians cricketers
Wicket-keepers